Dafniotissa, is a village in the eastern part of the municipal unit of Amaliada, Elis, Greece. It is situated in the hills southwest of the Pineios reservoir. It is 1 km south of Keramidia, 3 km southeast of Dafni, 5 km west of Efyra and 10 km northeast of Amaliada.

Historical population

References

External links
Dafniotissa (in Greek)

See also
List of settlements in Elis

Amaliada
Populated places in Elis